In Old Cheyenne is a 1941 American Western  film directed by Joseph Kane and starring Roy Rogers.

Plot summary

Cast 
Roy Rogers as Steve Blane
George "Gabby" Hayes as Arapaho Brown
Joan Woodbury as Della Casey / Dolores Casino
J. Farrell MacDonald as Tim Casey
Sally Payne as "Squeak" Brown
George Rosener as Sam Drummond
William Haade as Henchman Davidge
Hal Taliaferro as Henchman Pete
Jack Kirk as Henchman Rufe

Soundtrack 
 "Bonita" (Music by Jule Styne, lyrics by Sol Meyer)
 "Linda Flor" (Written by Rudy Sooter and Aaron González)

External links 

1941 films
1941 Western (genre) films
1940s romance films
1940s action adventure films
American black-and-white films
Films set in Wyoming
American Western (genre) films
American romance films
American action adventure films
Films directed by Joseph Kane
Republic Pictures films
1940s English-language films
1940s American films